Innovation Norway is a state-owned company and a national development bank.

The company's programs and services are intended to stimulate entrepreneurship in Norway. Its head office is in Oslo, and an office in each of the Norwegian counties. It also has offices in 30 countries around the world. The company has over 500 employees worldwide and has supported maritime transportation, biotechnology, thin film, and alternative fuel.

History 
Innovation Norway was formed in 2004 through the merger of four governmental organizations. These organizations were:

 The Norwegian Tourist Board
 The Norwegian Trade Council
 The Norwegian Industrial and Regional Development Fund (SND)
 The Government Consultative Office for Inventors (SVO)

The “Sommarøy” controversy 
In the summer of 2019 Innovation Norway were involved in the production of a spoof news story about the island Sommarøy. The story claimed that due to long days in the summer and long nights during winter, inhabitants didn't have the need to follow international conventions of time. The aim of the spoof news story was to advertise Northern Norway. The advert was originally presented as a legitimate news story, and its multiple false claims were only discovered after the story had been disseminated world wide. The company was strongly criticized for their promotional strategy. Innovation Norway has since issued an apology regretting their lack of transparency and vowing to scrutinize their routines.

References

External links
 Innovation Norway's English pages
 Innovations offices abroad

 
Government-owned companies of Norway
Banks of Norway